Hymenaea martiana is a tree species in the genus Hymenaea found in Brazil (Alagoas, Bahia, Ceara, Goias, Mato Grosso, Minas Gerais, Pernambuco) and Paraguay.

Chemicals
The three rhamnosides eucryphin, astilbin and engelitin can be isolated from the bark of H. martiana.

References

martiana
Trees of Brazil
Trees of Paraguay